In ancient times, Maldives were renowned for cowries, coir rope, dried tuna fish (Maldive fish), ambergris (maavaharu) and coco de mer (tavakkaashi). Local and foreign trading ships used to load these products in the Maldives and bring them abroad.

Nowadays, the mixed economy of Maldives is based on the principal activities of tourism, fishing and shipping.

Tourism is the largest industry in the Maldives, accounting for 28% of GDP and more than 60% of the Maldives' foreign exchange receipts. It powered the current GDP per capita to expand 265% in the 1980s and a further 115% in the 1990s. Over 90% of government tax revenue flows in from import duties and tourism-related taxes.

Fishing is the second leading sector in the Maldives. The economic reform program by the government in 1989 lifted import quotas and opened some exports to the private sector. Subsequently, it has liberalized regulations to allow more foreign investment.

Agriculture and manufacturing play a minor role in the economy, constrained by the limited availability of cultivable land and shortage of domestic labour. Most staple foods are imported.

Industry in the Maldives consists mainly of garment production, boat building, and handicrafts. It accounts for around 18% of GDP. Maldivian authorities are concerned about the impact of erosion and possible global warming in the low-lying country.

Among the 1,190 islands in the Maldives, only 198 are inhabited. The population is scattered throughout the country, and the greatest concentration is on the capital island, Malé. Limitations on potable water and arable land, plus the added difficulty of congestion are some of the problems faced by households in Malé.

Development of the infrastructure in the Maldives is mainly dependent on the tourism industry and its complementary tertiary sectors, transport, distribution, real estate, construction, and government. Taxes on the tourist industry have been plowed into infrastructure and it is used to improve technology in the agricultural sector.

Macro-economic trend
This is a chart of trend of gross domestic product of Maldives at market prices estimated  by the International Monetary Fund with figures in millions of rufiyaa.

The Maldives has experienced relatively low inflation throughout the recent years. Real GDP growth averaged about 10% in the 1980s. It expanded by an exceptional 16.2% in 1990, declined to 4% in 1993, and, over the 1995–2004 decade, real GDP growth averaged just over 7.5% per year. In 2005, as a result of the tsunami, the GDP contracted by about 5.5%; however, the economy rebounded in 2006 with a 13% increase.

The following table shows the main economic indicators in 1980–2020.

Economic sectors

Tourism

Fishing

Industry

The industrial sector provides only about 7% of GDP. Traditional industry consists of boat building and handicrafts, while modern industry is limited to a few tuna canneries, five garment factories, a bottling plant, and a few enterprises in the capital producing PVC pipe, soap, furniture, and food products. There are no patent laws in the Maldives.

Financial
The banking industry dominates the small financial sector of the Maldives. The country's seven banks are regulated by the Maldives Monetary Authority. The Maldives has no income, sales, property, or capital-gains taxes, and has been considered to have the simplest tax code in the world. The Tax Justice Network gave the Maldives a "secrecy score" of 92 on its 2011 Financial Secrecy Index - the highest score in that category of any actively-ranked country. However, the Maldives' minor market share put it near the bottom of the overall weighted lists.

Shipping
Beginning in the 1990s, the Port of Male received over £10 million in loans from the Asian Development Bank designated for infrastructure upgraded. The ADB notes that from 1991 to 2011, due to the loans, the ports annual throughput in freight tons equaled 273,000. By 2011 that number reached 1 million. The ADB also provided training for port authority staff to increase efficiency. ADB and the Government of Maldives, in a joint report address ship turn-around, "What used to take about 10 days in 1991 was achieved in 3.8 days by 1997, and about 2.6 days by 2014".

Environmental concerns
There is growing concern towards the coral reef and marine life due to coral mining (used for building and jewelry making), sand dredging, solid waste pollution and oil spills from boats. Mining of sand and coral has destroyed the natural coral reef that once protected several important islands, now making them highly susceptible to the erosive effects of the sea.  The destruction of large coral beds due to heat is also a growing concern.

In April 1987, high tides swept over the Maldives, inundating much of Malé and nearby islands which prompted Maldivian authorities to take global climatic changes seriously.  An INQUA research in 2003 found that actual sea levels in the Maldives had dropped in the 1970s and forecasts little change in the next century. There is also concern over the questionable shark fishing practices in place in the island. Shark fishing is forbidden by law, but these laws are not enforced. The population of sharks has sharply decreased in recent years.

The Asian brown cloud hovering in the atmosphere over the northern Indian Ocean is also another concern.  Studies show that decreased sunshine and increased acid rain source from this cloud.

Energy 
While electricity in the Maldives has historically come entirely from diesel generators, solar power has been increasingly adopted to avoid high fuel costs. The resort on Dhiddhoofinolhu claims to have the world's largest oceanic floating solar plant, with 678 kW enough to supply peak demand. The country's Environment Ministry has deployed solar–battery–diesel hybrid systems across the outer islands to reduce subsidies for imported diesel and promote low-carbon energy independence.

Poverty, income and gender inequality

Maldives achieved their Millennium Development Goal (MDG) of halving the proportion of people living under the poverty line to 1% as of 2011. Starvation is non-existent, HIV rates have fallen and malaria has been eradicated. Despite these accomplishments and progressive economic growth, developmental issues remain. In particular, the country needs to address income and gender disparities. Development in Maldives has occurred predominantly in the capital Malé; islands outside the capital continue to encounter high poverty vulnerability, lower per-capita income, lower employment and limited access to social services. A country-wide household income survey in 1997-1998 showed that the average income in the capital Malé was 75% higher than in surrounding islands. Maldives's Gini co-efficient stands at 0.41.

Poverty and Income Disparity

The factors that have led to Maldivians falling into or remaining in poverty are:
 Geography: Residents of the northern regions of Maldives tend to remain in poverty more than other regions due to the relatively lower level of development in the North;
  Health: Maldivians who do not work due to poor health remain in poverty possibly on account of lower accessibility to health services in the country;
  Young household members: Larger proportion of young family members results in a lower overall household income;
 Female household members: Lower female labour participation rate and therefore, households with a greater proportion of females will have lower household income.

The difficulty of accessing social services and infrastructure in the outer atolls has meant that geography is a key reason for poverty and income disparity in Maldives. In islands far from the capital, there tends to be lack of production, inadequate use of fishery resources, low value chain development and insufficient credit for small-scale producers and entrepreneurs. The scarcity of land and water, the underdeveloped farming practices and absence of support services in atolls has meant low production and thus low incomes in these regions.

Current Efforts

The government has recognized these issues of income and gender disparities and with the United Nations Development Programme (UNDP), Maldives has implemented policies that directly address these issues. In 2011, President Nasheed said, "The most important facility for a country's development is its people... and since women are half of the population in any country, for a certainty their full participation will speed up the pace of development."

See also
 Economic aid to Maldives

References

External links
 Global Economic Prospects: Growth Prospects for South Asia The World Bank, December 13, 2006
 "Doing Business in Maldives" The World Bank Group
 "IMF October 2021 report" International Monetary Fund

 
Maldives